Gezeh (also Romanized as Gazeh; also known as Gaza) is a village in Faramarzan Rural District, Jenah District, Bastak County, Hormozgan Province, Iran. At the 2006 census, its population was 516, in 108 families.

References 

Populated places in Bastak County